Rawi E. Abdelal is the Joseph C. Wilson Professor of Business Administration at Harvard Business School in the Business, Government, and International Economy Unit. In 1993, Abdelal earned a B.S. in Economics at Georgia Institute of Technology. In 1997, he earned a M.A., and in 1999 a Ph.D., in Government from Cornell University.

Publications

References 

Living people
Cornell University alumni
Georgia Tech alumni
Harvard Business School faculty
American international relations scholars
Year of birth missing (living people)